Events from the year 1625 in Ireland.

Incumbent
Monarch: James I (until 27 March), then Charles I

Events
 March 21 – James Ussher is appointed Archbishop of Armagh (Church of Ireland) and Primate of All Ireland.
 March 27 – Charles I becomes King of England, Scotland and Ireland upon the death of his father James I.
 Castle at Ballycastle, County Antrim, rebuilt by Randal MacDonnell, 1st Earl of Antrim.

Births
Dáibhí Ó Bruadair, poet (d. 1698)
approximate date – Sir George Bingham, 2nd Baronet, politician (d. 1682)

Deaths
February 19 – Arthur Chichester, 1st Baron Chichester, English administrator and soldier, Lord Deputy of Ireland (b. 1563)
March 10 - Francis Edgeworth, Clerk of the Crown and Hanaper in Ireland under James I
December 25 - Connor Roe Maguire (Conchubhar Rua Mag Uidhir) was an Irish Gaelic chief from Magherastephana, County Fermanagh, nicknamed the Queen's Maguire for supporting Elizabeth I's campaign in the Nine Years' War.

References

 
1620s in Ireland
Ireland
Years of the 17th century in Ireland